This article presents a list of the historical events and publications of Australian literature during 1896.

Books 

 Guy Boothby
 The Beautiful White Devil
 Doctor Nikola
 Ernest Favenc – The Moccasins of Silence
 E. W. Hornung – The Rogue's March: A Romance
 Fergus Hume – The Expedition of Captain Flick
 Louise Mack – The World is Round
 Ethel Turner – The Little Larrikin

Short stories 

 Barbara Baynton – "The Tramp" (aka "The Chosen Vessel") 
 Ada Cambridge – "The Wind of Destiny"
 Albert Dorrington – "A Bush Tanqueray"
 Edward Dyson
 "Court Day at Billybilly"
 "The Elopement of Mrs Peters"
 "Spicer's Courtship"
 Henry Lawson 
 "Black Joe"
 "The Geological Spieler"
 While the Billy Boils
 Louisa Lawson – "What the Frogs Said"
 K. Langloh Parker – Australian Legendary Tales (edited)
 A. B. Paterson – "White-When-He's-Wanted"
 Steele Rudd – "Dad and the Two Donovans"
 Charles Henry Souter – "A Martyr of No Account"
 Ethel Turner – The Little Duchess and Other Stories

Poetry 

 Christopher Brennan – "Towards the Source : 1894-97 : I : 10" (aka "The Yellow Gas")
 Victor J. Daley – "Day and Night"
 Edward Dyson
 "Peter Simson's Farm"
 Rhymes from the Mines and Other Lines
 Ernest Favenc – "The Watchers"
 Henry Lawson 
 In the Days When the World was Wide and Other Verses
 "Past Carin'"
 "The Star of Australasia"
 A. B. Paterson 
 "Hay and Hell and Booligal"
 "Mulga Bill's Bicycle"
 "Pioneers"
 "Rio Grande's Last Race"
 "Song of the Artesian Water"
 J. Le Gay Brereton – The Song of Brotherhood, and Other Verses

Biography 

 Henry Parkes – An Emigrant's Home Letters

Births 

A list, ordered by date of birth (and, if the date is either unspecified or repeated, ordered alphabetically by surname) of births in 1896 of Australian literary figures, authors of written works or literature-related individuals follows, including year of death.

 20 March – Cecil Mann, editor and critic (died 1967)
 3 April – Ronald Campbell, novelist and short story writer (died 1970)
 28 September – Edward Harrington, poet (died 1966)
 16 November – Joan Lindsay, novelist (died 1984)

Deaths 

A list, ordered by date of death (and, if the date is either unspecified or repeated, ordered alphabetically by surname) of deaths in 1896 of Australian literary figures, authors of written works or literature-related individuals follows, including year of birth.

 27 April – Henry Parkes, poet and politician (born 1815)
 27 December – Henry Clay, poet (born 1844)

See also 
 1896 in poetry
 List of years in literature
 List of years in Australian literature
 1896 in literature
 1895 in Australian literature
 1896 in Australia
 1897 in Australian literature

References

Literature
Australian literature by year
19th-century Australian literature
1896 in literature